Sanjivani Baburao Jadhav (born 12 July 1996) is an Indian long-distance athlete at 5000m and 10,000m. She had won a bronze medal at 5000m at the 2017 Asian Athletics Championships.

Life
Jadhav was born in Nashik which is a city in Maharashtra. She attended Bhonsala Military College where she combined her ambition for sport with that of becoming a civil servant. She had initially tried her hand in wrestling and even participated in National level tournaments before taking the plunge to track and field after coach Vijender Singh convinced her parents. She was identified as an outstanding athlete and supported by SportsNest who nurture sports athletes. In 2013 she won three medals at the 1st Asian School Athletics Meet. She came second in the 2016 Delhi marathon.

She is coached by Vijender Singh who trained Kavita Raut. In 2017 she won a bronze medal at the Asian Athletic games in Odisha during the 2017 Asian Athletics Championships – Women's 5000 metres. She was fifth in the Women's 10,000 metre at the same event. In 2018 she took a bronze medal in the 8 km event as part of the Asian Cross Country Championships in Guiyang. The gold and silver were taken by Li Dan of China and Japanese Abe Yukari.

In 2018, she has received the Shiv Chhatrapati Award from the Government of Maharashtra.

References

1996 births
Living people
Indian female long-distance runners
Athletes from Maharashtra
Sportswomen from Maharashtra
Universiade medalists in athletics (track and field)
Athletes (track and field) at the 2018 Asian Games
Universiade medalists for India
Asian Games competitors for India
Medalists at the 2017 Summer Universiade